is a 2016 Japanese drama/comedy directed by Shinobu Yaguchi. The film was produced by Takashi Ishihara, Minami Ichikawa, and Kiyoshi Nagai. The film was selected for the International Film Festival & Awards in Macao, for 2016.

Plotline 
This film centers on the main character Yoshiyuki Suzuki (played by Fumiyo Kohinata) and his family. When the electricity in Tokyo stops due to a solar flare, the city is on the verge of panic. Yoshiyuki has to lead his family to strive for survival. The family is used to being spoilt by modern urban life. However, they learn to deal with the harsh realities of a dystopic Japan where the lack of electricity has led everyone to rediscover the olden ways that do not rely on technology.

Cast 
 Fumiyo Kohinata
 Eri Fukatsu
 Yuki Izumisawa
 Wakana Aoi

References

External links 

2016 comedy-drama films
2016 films
Japanese comedy-drama films
2010s Japanese films